Martaza Lagoon is a small salty lagoon in the Tuzly Lagoons group in Tatarbunary Raion of Odessa Oblast, Ukraine. It is separated from the Shahany Lagoon by the sandbar in its north part, near the Village of Rybalske (old name - Martaza). The total area of the lagoon - 0.5 km2.

The water body is included to the Tuzly Lagoons National Nature Park.

Sources
 Starushenko L.I., Bushuyev S.G. (2001) Prichernomorskiye limany Odeschiny i ih rybohoziaystvennoye znacheniye. Astroprint, Odessa, 151 pp. 

Tuzly Lagoons